Release the Spyce is a Japanese anime television series created by Sorasaki F., Takahiro, and Namori, produced by ASCII Media Works and animated by Lay-duce. The series aired in Japan from October to December 2018. A manga and a serial novel were published by ASCII Media Works.

Plot
The series follows Tsukikage, a group of female high school spies who gain power from spices and secretly fight against crime syndicates to protect the city of Sorasaki. Momo Minamoto, a girl with heightened senses and deductive abilities, is recruited to join Tsukikage and train under fellow member Yuki Hanzōmon. Together, Tsukikage battles against the evil organisation Moryo.

Characters

Tsukikage
 

The main protagonist serving as a second-year student at Sorasaki High School, Momo wishes to protect her hometown like her late police officer father did. She has powerful eyesight, a strong sense of smell, and can identify a person's physical condition by licking them.
 

Serving as the leader of Tsukikage, Yuki is a third-year student who is charged with training Momo. She lost her right eye during a mission two years prior to the events of the series. At the end of the series, she leaves Tsukikage and her memory is erased, although the last scene implies that she kept her memories.
 

Fū is a first-year student and Mei's apprentice, who acts jealous towards those who get close to Mei. She works at a maid café in order to support her family.
 

A second-year student in Momo's class, Mei is a cheerful Tsukikage spy in charge of training Fū. She plays the guitar and holds street performances in order to gather intelligence. She is later revealed to be working under Moryo, in which she leaked Tsukikage personal information to the Moryo and betrayed her teammates. However, it is then revealed that she was actually serving as a triple agent to obtain Moryo's trust and then destroy them from the inside.
 

Goe is Momo's classmate and Hatsume's apprentice, who likes animals and plushies. She was once briefly brainwashed, although she was able to return to normal.
 

Yuki's childhood friend and Goe's teacher, Hatsume is responsible for developing the various gadgets Tsukikage use during their missions.

Working at the curry shop used as a front for Tsukikage's hideout, Katrina is a former Tsukikage spy who retired after becoming too old to use the spyce they use.

Moryo
 

The main antagonist who serves as the leader of the evil Moryo organization, she gives her mercenaries jelly drinks to energize them, as well as wipe their memories when they fail their missions.

Theresia is a silver-haired girl who was kidnapped and sold to Moryo as a child. She was once friends with Hatsume who was kidnapped alongside her, but was led to assume she had abandoned her when she was the only one who was rescued.

Byakko is a girl with great strength despite her childlike appearance. After she is captured by Tsukikage, her memories are wiped and she begins working in the hideout.

A mercenary working for Moryo, Dolte is a muscular woman who, when powered up, becomes almost impervious to pain and can track anyone by their scent.

Media

Print media
A manga adaptation titled  and illustrated by Meia Mitsuki began serialization in the March 2018 issue of Dengeki G's Comic on January 30, 2018, while a serial novel adaptation titled Release the Spyce: Golden Genesis was released in the March 2018 issue of Dengeki G's Novel as an appendix for the Dengeki G's Magazine on February 27, 2018.

Anime
The series was directed by Akira Sato and features a concept written by Takahiro and original character designs by Namori. It was animated by Lay-duce and aired in Japan from October 7 to December 23, 2018. Sentai Filmworks has licensed the series and streamed it on Hidive. An English dub has also been produced for the series. The series ran for 12 episodes.

Video game
A free-to-play mobile game titled Release the Spyce: Secret Fragrance was released for iOS and Android devices on February 12, 2019. The game's service ended on March 31, 2020.

Notes

References

External links
Official website 

2018 Japanese novels
Anime with original screenplays
ASCII Media Works manga
Dengeki Comics
Dengeki G's Magazine
Espionage in anime and manga
Japanese serial novels
Kadokawa Dwango franchises
Lay-duce
Mainichi Broadcasting System original programming
Seinen manga
Sentai Filmworks
Terrorism in fiction
Terrorism in television